Always Yours is a 2007 Spanish neo-noir drama film directed by Manuel Lombardero. It stars Flora Martínez, Rubén Ochandiano, José Coronado, and Caroline Henderson.

Plot 
The fiction follows Lola and her boyfriend Alfredo, a petty criminal. The former began working in a jazz club frequented by quaint individuals (including a forensic photographer, a young musician becoming blind, an alcoholic pianist, and a jazz singer) but the entry on the scene of mafioso Manuel Gay causes disruption.

Cast

Production 
The screenplay was penned by Manuel Lombardero alongside Ignacio del Moral. The film was produced by Pastora Delgado PC and Films d'Ultramort, and it had the participation of TVE.

Release 
The film screened at the Málaga Film Festival in March 2007. Distributed by Azeta Cinema, it was theatrically released in Spain on 27 April 2007.

Reception 
Jonathan Holland of Variety considered that despite boasting a "pleasant jazz score", a clutch of "decent" performances, and coming with all the genre trimmings, "the script fails to whip them up into anything beyond an efficient exercise in style".

Javier Ocaña of El País deemed Always Yours to be "a painful, somber film with a great sound and image design", featuring a "atmosphere, credibility and a formal design that is as risky as it is meritorious", but also pointed out at a flawed direction of actors, as each one of them performs in a different dramatic range.

Accolades 

|-
| rowspan = "3" align = "center" | 2007 || rowspan = "3" | 10th Málaga Film Festival || Best Supporting Actor || Nancho Novo ||  || rowspan = "3" | 
|-
| Best Music || José Reinoso, Horacio Fumero || 
|-
| Best Makeup || Gregorio Ros || 
|-
| align =" center" | 2008 || 22nd Goya Awards || Best Sound || Licio Marcos de Oliveira, Carlos Fesser, David Calleja ||  || 
|}

See also 
 List of Spanish films of 2007

References 

2007 drama films
Neo-noir
Spanish drama films
2000s Spanish-language films
2000s Spanish films